Francesco Antonio Coratoli (13 December 1671 – 10 June 1722) was an Italian painter of the late-Baroque or Rococo periods.

Born in Monteleone di Puglia, Coratoli trained under a painter by the name of Zoda. He travelled to Rome to study painting. His works include frescoes in the Basilica di San Leone Luca, Santa Maria di Gesù, a Coronation of the Virgin for the church of Santa Maria degli Angeli, and a Marriage of St. Joseph for il Gesù. He died in Monteleone.

References

1671 births
1722 deaths
People from Foggia
17th-century Italian painters
Italian male painters
18th-century Italian painters
Italian Baroque painters
Rococo painters
18th-century Italian male artists